"The Official BBC Children in Need Medley" is a single by Peter Kay's Animated All Star Band. It is the official Children in Need Single for 2009, and was released on 21 November 2009. The song was shown for the first time on Children in Need 2009. The cover art is a parody of the cover of Sgt. Pepper's Lonely Hearts Club Band by the Beatles. The single has sold over 452,000 copies in the UK, earning it gold status from the BPI.

History
According to a news interview, Kay conceptualized the single while working with the director. The director said that he would "love to do something like that" but he and Kay regarded it mostly as a joke.

After some time away from the subject, Kay brought it up again, this time with the actual intent to produce it. The director said that he and Kay "just sat down one lunchtime and wrote a list", with as many characters recorded on it as they could think of from their childhoods, as well as some modern favourites and US cartoon characters. The song was recorded at Hullabaloo Studios by the Voice and Music Company.

The project was carried out in top secret at the request of executive producer Kay. Celebrities and voice artists who voiced characters' original vocals were brought in without being told details of the project. When contacted by Cartoon Network Studios, Casey Kasem agreed to take part on the condition that Shaggy was shown to be a vegetarian and asked not to be given credit as he was officially retired.

The project took 132 hours to mix the vocals of the seven songs, eight months to animate, and around two years in total. Many of the original character models had been packed away, given to museums or cremated. Where possible the originals were found and transported to Chapman Studios in Altrincham from all over the world. In cases where the original models no longer existed, such as the characters from Camberwick Green and Trumpton, new copies of the original models were created.

Because permission was not given by Royal Mail to use their more up to date logo, Postman Pat's van was a modified design with only the number plate PAT 4.

The single raised at least £170,000 for Children in Need after more than 265,000 CD, DVD and download sales by mid-December 2009.

Composition

The single is a medley of multiple songs played out in the following order:
 "Can You Feel It" – originally performed by the Jacksons (1981) (0:00–1:08)
 "Don't Stop" – originally performed by Fleetwood Mac (1976) (1:08–2:27)
 "Jai Ho!" from the film Slumdog Millionaire – originally performed by A.R. Rahman and the Pussycat Dolls (2009) (2:12–2:41)
 "Tubthumping" – originally performed by Chumbawamba (1997) (2:41–3:00)
 "Never Forget" – originally performed by Take That (1995) (3:00–3:18)
 "Hey Jude" – originally performed by the Beatles (1968) (3:18–4:30)
 "One Day Like This" – originally performed by Elbow (2008) (3:37–4:30)

Chart performance
The single entered the UK Singles Chart on download sales alone at number 18. On iTunes, the video was being downloaded almost three times as much as the single. Video sales are not included in the UK Singles Chart, so it was felt that the single might not chart as highly as expected, however it climbed to number one in its second week on the chart after it was released on CD and DVD. Although it peaked very highly on the UK Singles Chart, it peaked surprisingly low on the UK Downloads Chart, at number 30. The high physical sales of the single meant that it held off Jason Derulo's "Whatcha Say" in its first week and Rihanna's "Russian Roulette" in its second week. In its third week, the single dropped to number 2 after it was knocked off the number one spot by Lady Gaga's "Bad Romance". In the fourth week, the single fell to number 4 and then number 11 in its fifth week. In its sixth week, the song dropped 24 places to 35. The song entered the European Hot 100 at number 58; the next week it climbed 51 places to number 7, and peaked at number 5; the song then dropped to number 11 the next week. The song entered the Irish Singles Chart at number 25, then the following week the song moved up to 19, and peaked at number 6.

As of November 2016, the song has sold 452,000 copies in the UK.

Music video Characters

The music video shows the Animated All Star Band meeting and recording the song in a studio, spoofing other charity songs in the style of Band Aid's "Do They Know It's Christmas?", with Big Chris, the character voiced by Kay in Roary the Racing Car, first arranging the recording session and then leading the singing.

The music video features over 100 cartoon characters from different production companies. Nearly all of the characters are voiced by their original UK voice artists including Ringo Starr (who was a member of the Beatles who recorded "Hey Jude", which is sung here) as Thomas the Tank Engine. One of the exceptions is Scooby-Doo who is voiced by Frank Welker since original voice artist Don Messick died in 1997. Most of the contributions are stop motion characters. Some appear on TV screens within the stop motion world "via satellite", including US cartoon characters Shaggy Rogers, Scooby-Doo, and Ben Tennyson. Roobarb and Custard, Peppa Pig, George Pig and Muffin the Mule are also included. Cartoon characters SpongeBob SquarePants and Angelina Ballerina appear on Big Chris' smartphone.

The video depicts Big Chris at night talking to Postman Pat on the phone, saying he wants to get everyone together for the recording. Bob the Builder sings The Jacksons' "Can You Feel It", joined by Postman Pat, Ben Tennyson, Fireman Sam, Wendy, and Marsha. Scooby-Doo and Shaggy sing Fleetwood Mac's "Don't Stop", accompanied by The Koala Brothers, The Wombles, Aloysius Parker, and Peppa Pig. Fifi sings The Pussycat Dolls' "Jai Ho", accompanied by other female characters, Ajay Bains joins their flash mob much to the disapproval of Bob, Big Chris, Mr. Carburettor, Sam, Elvis, Steele, Pat, Virgil, Parker, and Brains. Ajay then realizes his mistake and joins the men for their new rendition of Chumbawamba's "Tubthumping", and then the entire cast sing a montage of Take That's "Never Forget", the Beatles' "Hey Jude", and Elbow's "One Day Like This". At the end of the video, Chippy Minton appears, only to be informed by Big Chris that they have just finished.

CAST Voice Actor 

Mattel Television
Thomas & Friends
Thomas the Tank Engine (voiced by Sir Ringo Starr)
Sir Topham Hatt
Fireman Sam
Fireman Sam Jones (voiced by Steven Kynman)
Firefighter Elvis Cridlington (voiced by Steven Kynman)
Station Officer Norris Steele (voiced by David Carling)
Firefighter Penny Morris (voiced by Tegwen Tucker)
Bob the Builder
Bob the Builder (voiced by Neil Morrissey)
Wendy (voiced by Kate Harbour)
Spud (voiced by Rob Rackstraw)
Scoop (also voiced by Rob Rackstraw)
Pilchard
Pingu
Pingu (voiced by Marcello Magni)
Rubbadubbers
Tubb (voiced by John Gordon Sinclair)
Terence (also voiced by John Gordon Sinclair)
Finbar (voiced by Sean Hughes)
Sploshy (voiced by Maria Darling)
Angelina Ballerina: The Next Steps
Angelina Ballerina (voiced by Charlotte Spencer)
 Other incidental characters from Bob the Builder
 5 unnamed photographers
 1 cameraman
 1 man at mixing desk
DreamWorks Classics
Woodland Animations Ltd:
Postman Pat
Postman Pat (voiced by Lewis MacLeod)
Jess
Ajay Bains (voiced by Kulvinder Ghir)
Nisha Bains (voiced by Archie Panjabi)
Mrs Goggins (voiced by Carole Boyd)
Ted Glen (voiced by Ken Barrie)
Meera Bains*
Chapman Entertainment
Roary the Racing Car
Roary the Racing Car (voiced by Maria Darling)
Big Chris (voiced by Peter Kay)
Marsha (also voiced by Maria Darling)
Mr Carburettor (voiced by Tim Whitnall) 
Rusty (voiced by Dominic Frisby) 
Flash
Big Christine
Farmer Green (voiced by Tim Whitnall) 
Fifi and the Flowertots
Fifi Forget-Me-Not (voiced by Jane Horrocks)
Mo
Stingo (voiced by Tim Whitnall) 
Violet (voiced by Maria Darling) 
Bumble (voiced by Marc Silk) 
Primrose (also voiced by Jane Horrocks)
Slugsy  (also voiced by Marc Silk) 
Buttercup (voiced by Joanna Ruiz)
Daisy (voiced by Janet James)
Flutterby*
Raa Raa the Noisy Lion
Raa Raa the Noisy Lion 
Although the character appears in the video, Ra Ra The Noisy Lion didn’t actually premiere until 2011
Spellbound Entertainment Ltd
The Koala Brothers
Frank the Koala (voiced by Keith Wickham)
Buster the Koala (voiced by Rob Rackstraw)
Create Media Ventures
Little Robots
Tiny (voiced by Hayley Carmichael)
Stretchy (voiced by Jimmy Hibbert) 
Sporty (voiced by Lenny Henry) 
Scary (voiced by Mike Hayley)
Noisy
BBC Studios
 Muffin the Mule
The Woodentops
 Daddy Woodentop
 Mummy Woodentop
Flower Pot Men
Bill (voiced by John Thomson)
Ben (voiced by Jimmy Hibbert)
Andy Pandy
Andy Pandy
Looby Loo
Teddy
Children in Need
Pudsey Bear
 

 
Cosgrove Hall Films Ltd
Engie Benjy
Engie Benjy (voiced by Declan Donnelly)
Jollop the Dog
WildBrain
Cookie Jar Entertainment:
Paddington (1975 TV series)/Paddington Bear & The Adventures of Paddington Bear (1997) 
Paddington Bear (voiced by Jonathan Kydd)
The Wombles
Alderney (voiced by Bernard Cribbins)
Orinoco (voiced by Bernard Cribbins)
Bungo (voiced by Bernard Cribbins)
Wellington (voiced by Bernard Cribbins)
Great Uncle Bulgaria*
Ragdoll Productions
Teletubbies
Tinky Winky (voiced by Simon Shelton)
Dipsy (voiced by John Simmit)
Laa-Laa (voiced by Nikky Smedley)
Po (voiced by Pui Fan Lee)
In the Night Garden...
Igglepiggle
Upsy Daisy
Makka Pakka
Tombliboos
Pinky Ponk
Entertainment One and Hasbro
Peppa Pig
Peppa Pig (voiced by Harley Bird)
George Pig
ITV International Media Limited
Thunderbirds
Virgil Tracy
Brains
Aloysius Parker (voiced by David Graham)
Lady Penelope Creighton-Ward
Alan Tracy*
Gordon Tracy*
Thunderbird 2*
Smallfilms
Bagpuss
Hanna-Barbera and Cartoon Network Studios
Ben 10: Alien Force
Ben Tennyson (voiced by Yuri Lowenthal)
Scooby-Doo
Scooby-Doo (voiced by Frank Welker)
Shaggy Rogers (voiced by Casey Kasem)
Nickelodeon
SpongeBob SquarePants
SpongeBob SquarePants
Monster Animation & Design / A&B TV
Roobarb
Roobarb (voiced by Richard Briers)
Custard (voiced by Richard Briers)
Fluffy Gardens
Paolo the Cat
Mavis the Pony
Small Green Thing
ITV Studios
Rainbow
Zippy (voiced by Roy Skelton and puppeteered by Ronnie Le Drew)
George (voiced by Roy Skelton)
The Sooty Show
Sooty (voiced and puppeteered by Brian Sandford)
Sweep (voiced and puppeteered by Jimmy Hibbert)
Soo (voiced and puppeteered by Brenda Longman)
Gordon Murray's Productions
Camberwick Green
Windy Miller (voiced by Brian Cant)
Trumpton
Chippy Minton
Miss Lovelace (voiced by Brian Cant)

 
Characters with an asterisk (*) after their names, appear on the cover montage but not in the music video itself.

Track listing

Charts

Weekly charts

Year-end charts

Certifications

Release history

References

2009 songs
2009 singles
Children in Need singles
Music medleys
Crossover animation
Crossover fiction
2009 in British music
All-star recordings
Number-one singles in Scotland
UK Singles Chart number-one singles